Bushra Qayyum (born: 11 July 1995) is a badminton player from Pakistan.

Career

National 
Qayyum represents WAPDA in domestic competitions including National Championships and National Games.

2020

At the 57th National Badminton Championship held in Lahore, Pakistan, Qayyum reaching the semi-finals in singles before losing to teammate, Ghazala Siddique in 2 sets (21-23, 6-21). In the team event. she helped WAPDA take the title 3–0 over SNGPL by winning the second single against Aqsa Zikriya by 21–16, 21-13 21–13, 21–15.

International 
Qayyum was part of the six member women's team which competed at the 2019 South Asian Games held in Kathmandu, Nepal.

Ranking 
Qayyum's current international ranking is 508 in singles and 366 in doubles.

Achievements

BWF International Challenge/Series (1 runners-up) 
Women's doubles

  BWF International Series tournament

References 

Living people
1995 births
Pakistani female badminton players
South Asian Games bronze medalists for Pakistan
South Asian Games medalists in badminton